The Goodnight (formerly Goodnight Sunrise) is an American pop rock band formed November 2006 in Helena, Montana while members were attending high school.

History
The band released their first EP mixed by Ron Saint Germaine, "Close and Counting" on October 25, 2007. "After the equivalent of a college education on the road with hundreds of shows, well over a dozen independent tours, and a first-hand introduction to the DIY approach at the music industry, Goodnight Sunrise made their exodus to Los Angeles in 2010."

"Starting with a tour the week of some members’ high school graduation, the band’s first few years on the road undeniably refined their direction and focus, preparing them to write songs that are the product of the honesty and work ethic that were essential for taking the project outside of their home state of Montana."

On April 28, 2009, Goodnight Sunrise released a cover of Jessica Simpson's "With You" as a part a compilation distributed by Destiny Worldwide called "Rockin' Romance."

Goodnight Sunrise's second EP, "Stop, Drop, & Roll," produced by guitarist Justin Benner was released in Japan through Twilight Records on June 10, 2009  and on June 23rd, 2009 in the United States. The EPs release was followed by a national tour with piano-rock band The Real You as well as several regional tours throughout the Northwestern United States.

After relocating to Los Angeles, the band began playing with drummer Tim Spier, formerly from the band Say No More before releasing the "Acoustic Sessions EP" on January 11, 2011.  Shortly after this, the band changed their name to "The Goodnight" and released their debut studio album, Owlbum.

Band members
Current line-up
Dan Murphy – vocals, guitar
Justin Benner – guitar, backing vocals
Miles Franco – bass guitar
Tim Spier – drums, percussion, backing vocals

Past members
Sam Smetana – bass guitar
Mike Ogle – drums, percussion, backing vocals

Discography

EPs
 Close and Counting (2007)
"It's The Stare"
"Routine and Dollar Signs"
"Sideshow Entertainment"
"Champions of the Weekend"
"To A New Hour"
"Routine and Dollar Signs (Acoustic Remix)"

Stop, Drop, & Roll (2009)
"Trophy Girls"
"On Your Birthday"
"Leave The Ground"
"Queso, I Have an Idea"
"Tell Me If I'm Wrong"
"Spirit Fingers"
"Wouldn't Change a Thing"

Acoustic Sessions (2011)
"Queso, I Have an Idea (Acoustic)"
"Tell Me if I'm Wrong (Acoustic)"
"Wouldn't Change A Thing (Acoustic)"

Not officially Released:
 Apart (on Facebook page)

References

External links 
 Goodnight Sunrise Twitter account
 Goodnight Sunrise MTV Account

American pop rock music groups
Musical groups established in 2006